The Dana Medal, established in 1998, is awarded by the Mineralogical Society of America and is named in honor of the contributions made by James Dwight Dana (1813–1895) and Edward Salisbury Dana (1849–1935) to the science of mineralogy. It recognizes outstanding scientific contributions through original research in the mineralogical sciences by an individual in the midst of his or her career.

Recipients
Source:

2001 – George R. Rossman
2002 – Michael F. Hochella, Jr.
2003 – Mark S. Ghiorso
2004 – R. James Kirkpatrick
2005 – William D. Carlson
2006 – Rodney C. Ewing
2007 – Frank S. Spear
2008 – Thomas Armbruster
2009 – Ronald E. Cohen
2010 – Jillian F. Banfield
2011 – Ross John Angel
2012 – Roberta Rudnick
2013 – Max W. Schmidt
2014 – Patricia M. Dove
2015 – Marc M. Hirschmann
2016 – Patrick Cordier
2016 - Sumit Chakraborty
2017 - Thomas W. Sisson
2018 - Jörg Hermann
2019 - Matthew J. Kohn
2020 - Daniela Rubatto

See also

 List of geology awards

References

Mineralogy
Geology awards
Awards established in 1998